Our Perfect Wedding is a South African wedding television show on Mzansi Magic DStv. Our Perfect Wedding is produced by Connect TV and hosted by Thembisa Mdoda.

The show started in 2011 with guest stars Tumi Morake, Jessica Nkosi and NkwaNkwa.

Seasons

Season 2
Our perfect wedding has up to 10 seasons

Plot
OPW is about South African weddings in Johannesburg, Pretoria and Cape Town. And it gives you an idea on how to pick a dress or a suit, cakes, decor and cars.

International
The reality show appears in Africa, and international countries like China, Brazil in Lifetime TV. It has 1,3 million international views and in Africa it has 5,2 million on its first season.

Presenters

Current
Vele Manenje
Nomsa Buthelezi

Past 
Jessica Nkosi
Thuli Thabethe
Tumi Morake
Brenda Ngxoli
NkwaNkwa
Ayanda Mpama
Phumeza Mdabe
Thembisa Mdoda Nxumalo
Kayise Nqula
 Anele Mdoda

Guest
Minnie Dlamini
Stella Ndlovu
Asipho Sethu
Bonang Matheba (guest judge)

Presenter Search
The presenter search of Our Perfect Wedding took place in Durban and Cape Town, it also aired on television on Thursday, October 2017 on DSTV channel 161 Mzansi Magic.

A second episode of our OPW Presenter Search aired on Mzansi Magic in Durban and it is all across Africa in Africa Digital. On Thursday a winner was announced to be the winner  will primer at January 2018.

Mbali Nkosi
Terry Pheto

Accolades

References

External links 

 Official site

2012 South African television series debuts